Pivot (2000) is an album by the American experimental pop music group Amoeba. The style of this album is similar to that of Amoeba’s previous album Watchful (1997) except with a somewhat more active and direct approach. The lyrics are also more literal and emotional than those of Watchful.

Track listing
”Fireflies” - 3:47
”No Empty Promises” - 4:34
”Traces” - 4:43
”Pivot” - 4:24
”Moonlight Flowers” - 3:40
”House of Rust” - 1:17
”Harvest” - 4:42
”Miniature” - 2:09
”Seasons Passing” - 5:01
”Underground” - 5:30
”Sparks” - 4:34
”To Other Days” - 4:15

Personnel
Robert Rich - vocals, piano, harmonium, synthesizers, lap steel guitar, flutes
Rick Davies - electric and acoustic guitars
with:
Don Swanson - drums
Andrew McGowan - bass
Hans Christian - cello
BobDog Catlin - megaptera vina (track 10)
Forrest Fang - violin (track 11)
Tom Heasley - tuba (tracks 3 and 11)

Amoeba (band) albums
2000 albums